Antonio Jesús Vázquez Muñoz (born 18 January 1980), known as Jesús Vázquez, is a Spanish former professional footballer who played as a midfielder.

He played 382 Segunda División games and scored 34 goals over 12 seasons, representing mainly Tenerife and Recreativo (four years apiece). He added 105 appearances in La Liga in a 19-year senior career, with the second club as well as Deportivo.

Club career
Born in Santa Olalla del Cala, Huelva, Andalusia, Vázquez first played professionally in the second division, with CF Extremadura and CD Tenerife, for a total of seven years. In the 2001–02 season, whilst with the former, he scored a career-best six goals in 39 games but saw his team get relegated.

For the 2006–07 campaign, Vázquez joined Recreativo de Huelva, recently promoted to La Liga, going on to be an undisputed first choice for his hometown club. He never appeared in less than 29 matches during his tenure, precisely when the side were relegated from the top level at the end of 2008–09.

Vázquez left Recre in late June 2011 at age 31, and signed with Deportivo de La Coruña for two years. He spent his first season nursing a serious leg injury, but still contributed 1,029 minutes in 12 starts to help the team return to the top flight after only one year.

On 12 July 2013, Vázquez returned to the Estadio Nuevo Colombino, with the club still in the second tier. He totalled 71 league appearances in his first two years (four goals), but was relegated at the end of his second.

Vázquez announced his retirement in May 2017, at the age of 37. After one season as manager of Recreativo's reserves in the regional leagues, he was appointed youth system coordinator.

Honours
Deportivo
Segunda División: 2011–12

References

External links

1980 births
Living people
Sportspeople from the Province of Huelva
Spanish footballers
Footballers from Andalusia
Association football midfielders
La Liga players
Segunda División players
Segunda División B players
CF Extremadura footballers
CD Tenerife players
Recreativo de Huelva players
Deportivo de La Coruña players
Spanish football managers
Tercera División managers